Kalach may refer to:

Places
 Kalach, Iran
 Kalach, Sverdlovsk Oblast, Russia
 Kalach, Liskinsky District, Voronezh Oblast, in the Liski, Voronezh Oblast urban settlement
 Kalach, Kalacheyevsky District, Voronezh Oblast, Russia
 Kalach-na-Donu, formerly Kalach, Kalachyovsky District, Volgograd Oblast, Russia
 Battle of Kalach, in 1942

Other uses
 Alberto Kalach (born 1960), Mexican architect
 Kalach (food), a traditional Eastern European bread

See also

 Kalacha (disambiguation)
 Kalachevsky (disambiguation)
 Kalacheyevsky (disambiguation)
 Kalash (disambiguation)